A Bachelor of Architecture (BArch) is a bachelor's degree designed to satisfy the academic requirement of practising architecture around the world.

Australia 
Architectural education in Australia varies depending on the university offering the course. All Australian architecture schools and programs have recently moved to some variation on the 3 + 2 Bologna model, with a three-year undergraduate degree, followed by a two-year course-work based Master of Architecture professional degree. Some universities also require 6–12 months of practice work experience between the two degrees. Registration as an architect is via state-based boards and requires a minimum of two years practice experience under the supervision of a registered architect. In addition there are double degrees offered by many universities, such as those combining architecture with construction or landscape architecture. Some universities also offer masters programs in architecture via coursework or research. Many architecture faculties offer related programs in landscape architecture, urban planning, urban design, property and construction. Entry to Australian architecture programs is highly competitive and the proportion of students at some architecture schools from outside Australia is very high, up to 40%.

Universities in Australia offering professionally accredited architecture programs:

 University of Adelaide
 University of South Australia (UniSA)
 University of Western Australia
 Curtin University of Technology
 University of Melbourne
 Monash University
 RMIT University
 Deakin University
 University of Tasmania
 University of New South Wales
 University of Sydney
 University of Technology, Sydney (UTS)
 Queensland University of Technology (QUT)
 University of Queensland
 University of Canberra
 University of Newcastle

Institutions in Australia offering other programs in architecture:

 Charles Darwin University 3-year Bachelor of Design, automatic entry into the Deakin University M.Arch. program.
 Oceania Polytechnic Institute of Technology 6-year Bachelor of Architecture, partially accredited by the Australian Institute of Architects
 Griffith University 3-year Bachelor of Environmental Design (Architectural Studies) begins February 2010. M.Arch. to begin in 2013.

Bangladesh
In Bangladesh Bachelor of Architecture (B. Arc) is a 5 years professional undergraduate degree. Some of the well known private and public universities with departments of architecture include:
 Bangladesh University of Engineering & Technology
 Shahjalal University of Science and Technology, Sylhet
 Khulna University, Khulna
 Khulna University of Engineering & Technology,  Khulna
 Chittagong University of Engineering and Technology, Chittagong
 Hajee Mohammad Danesh Science & Technology University, Dinajpur
 Ahsanullah University of Science and Technology, Dhaka
 South East University, Dhaka
 BRAC University, Dhaka
 American International University Bangladesh, Dhaka
 North South University, Dhaka
 Stamford University, Dhaka
 Fareast International University, Dhaka
 Bangladesh University, Dhaka
 Primeasia University, Dhaka
 State University of Bangladesh, Dhaka
 Pabna University of Science & Technology, Pabna
 University of Asia Pacific, Dhaka
 Shanto-Mariam University of Creative Technology, Dhaka.
 Dhaka University of Engineering and Technology, Dhaka
 Sonargaon University, Dhaka

China
In China, Bachelor of Architecture undergraduate programs take five years to complete. Only universities that pass the architectural assessment from the Academic Degrees Committee of the State Council of China can award Bachelor of Architecture degrees. Other universities can only award Bachelor of Engineering degrees with a major in architecture.

As of May 2016, universities with the authorization to confer Bachelor of Architecture degrees are listed below (sorted by the time of receiving the accreditation).
Tsinghua University
Tongji University
Southeast University
Tianjin University
Chongqing University
Harbin Institute of Technology
Xi'an University of Architecture and Technology
South China University of Technology
Zhejiang University
Hunan University
HeFei University of Technology
Beijing University of Civil Engineering and Architecture
Shenzhen University
Huaqiao University
Beijing University of Technology
Southwest Jiaotong University
Huazhong University of Science & Technology
Shenyang Jianzhu University
Zhengzhou University
Dalian University of Technology
Shandong Jianzhu University
Kunming University of Science and Technology
Nanjing Tech University
Jilin Jianzhu University
Wuhan University of Technology
Xiamen University
Guangzhou University
Hebei University of Engineering
Shanghai Jiao Tong University
Qingdao University of Technology
Anhui Jianzhu University
Xi'an Jiaotong University
Nanjing University
Central South University
Wuhan University
North China University of Technology
China University of Mining and Technology
Suzhou University of Science and Technology
Inner Mongolia University of Technology
Hebei University of Technology
Central Academy of Fine Arts
Fuzhou University
Beijing Jiaotong University
Zhejiang University of Technology
Yantai University
Tianjin Chengjian University
Northwestern Polytechnical University
Guangdong University of Technology
Sichuan University
Inner Mongolia University of Science&Technology
Chang'an University
Xinjiang University
Fujian University of Technology
Henan University of Technology
Changsha University of Science & Technology
Lanzhou University of Technology
Henan University
Lanzhou University of Technology
Hebei University of Architecture

France

In France, architectural education is offered in various independent schools of architecture, both private and public. The first step of architectural education is the Diploma of Studies in Architecture, a three-year non- professional degree. This degree does not allow registration as an architect, awardees must pursue a Master of Architecture in order to obtain vocational qualification.

India
In India, the Bachelor of Architecture lasts for 5 years. Specialised institutes founded by the Government of India, for excellence in the field of architecture and planning are Schools of Planning and Architecture. They are Institutes of National Importance through an act in the Parliament, on the lines of IITs, NITs and IIMs.

Currently, there are many such SPAs, with the Ministry of Education mulling over setting up more such institutes.
 School of Planning and Architecture, Delhi
 School of Planning and Architecture, Bhopal
 School of Planning and Architecture, Vijayawada
 School of Architecture & Planning, Lnct University , Bhopal
 School of Planning And Architecture, Mysore

Private institutes offering courses in architecture include the following:

 Vastu Kala Academy, New Delhi
 Rachana Sansad's Academy of Architecture, Mumbai
 Hindustan School of Architecture, Chennai
 Noble Architecture College, Junagadh (Gujarat)
 Amity School of Architecture and Planning, Noida, Uttar Pradesh
 Maulana Azad National Institute of Technology, Madhya Pradesh
 Christ University school of architecture, Bangalore
 East West School of Architecture, Bangalore
 School of Planning and Architecture, Centre for Design Excellence, Jaipur
 State University of Performing And Visual Arts, Rohtak
 National Institute of Technology Hamirpur, Himachal Pradesh
 National Institute of Technology Trichy, Tamil Nadu
 VIT’s PVP College of Architecture, Pune
 BMS College of Architecture, Bengaluru
 BMS School of Architecture, Bengaluru
 Ramaiah Institute of Technology, Bangalore
 Sir JJ College of Architecture, Mumbai
 Visvesvaraya National Institute of Technology, Maharashtra
 Vivekananda Global University, Jaipur
 Centre for Design Excellence, Jaipur
 Aayojan School of Architecture, Jaipur
 Malviya National Institute of Technology Jaipur, Rajasthan
 National Institute of Technology Raipur, Chhattisgarh
 Jamia Millia Islamia, New Delhi
 Aalim Muhammad salegh academy of architecture
 Apeejay School of Architecture and Planning
 Birla Institute of Technology, Mesra, Ranchi
 Birla Institute of Technology, Mesra, Patna Campus
 Integral University, Lucknow
 Centre for Environmental Planning and Technology University, Ahmedabad
 Chandigarh College of Architecture, Chandigarh
 IIT Kharagpur, West Bengal
 IIT Roorkee, Uttarakhand
 Indian Institute of Engineering Science and Technology, Howrah
 Jadavpur University, Kolkata
 Faculty of Architecture, Sarvajanik College of Engineering and Technology, Surat
 Manipal University
 NIT Calicut, Calicut
 University Visveswaraya College of Engineering, Bengaluru
 R.V. College of Architecture, Bengaluru
 Surya School of Architecture, Punjab Technical University
 Faculty of Architecture, Sri Sri University
 GITAM School of Architecture, GITAM University
 Prime Nest College of Architecture and Planning, Trichy, Tamil Nadu
 BGS School of Architecture and Planning, Bangalore BGSSAP
 Prime College of Architecture and Planning, Nagapattinam
 Rvs Kvk School of architecture, Trichy
 Tamilnadu school of architecture, Coimbatore, Tamil Nadu
 School of Planning and Architecture, Jawaharlal Nehru Architecture and Fine Arts University, Hyderabad
 School of Architecture - Coimbatore Institute of Engineering and Technology, Coimbatore

Ireland
Architectural education is available as a five-year long Bachelor of Architecture degree, or as a combination of a three-year or four-year Bachelor of Science in Architecture followed by a Master of Architecture that lasts one to two years. 

After completing a degree programme or programmes of study accredited by the Royal Institute of the Architects of Ireland, to become a registered architect a person must gain two years of practical experience working with a registered architect and must pass the Professional Practice Examination, in order to apply.

The following universities accredited by the RIAI offer a Bachelor of Architecture degree programme:

Technological University Dublin, Bolton Street campus
University of Limerick
South East Technological University, Waterford campus
Atlantic Technological University, Sligo campus (provisionally approved; full approval in 2023)

The following institutes accredited by the RIAI offer Bachelor of Science in Architecture and Master of Architecture degree programmes:
Cork Centre for Architectural Education (University College Cork/Munster Technological University)
Technological University Dublin, Bolton Street Campus
University College Dublin

Israel
Architectural education is offered in five universities, BArch lasts for five years in Israel (apart from the Technion which is split into B.Sc and M.Arch degrees and lasts for six years). Only universities that pass the architectural assessment from the Council for Higher Education in Israel, can award the BArch degree.

Bezalel Academy of Arts and Design, Jerusalem
Technion – Israel Institute of Technology, Haifa
Tel Aviv University, Tel Aviv
Ariel University, Ariel
WIZO Haifa Academy of Design and Education, Haifa

Turkey
Architectural education is offered in various universities as a four-year program. The language of the program depends on the university.

 Bilkent University
 Istanbul Bilgi University
 Istanbul Medipol University
 Istanbul Technical University
 Mimar Sinan Fine Arts University
 Özyeğin University
 TED University
 TOBB University of Economics and Technology
 Yeditepe University
 Yıldız Technical University

United Arab Emirates 
The American University of Sharjah is the first university outside of North America to offer a BArch that is officially accredited by the US-based National Architectural Accrediting Board (NAAB).

Other universities where UAE students enrol are:

 American University in Dubai offers NAAB accredited programme.
 Amity University, Dubai campus offers CoA accredited programme.
 Abu Dhabi University, offers RIBA accredited programme.
 Canadian University, Dubai offers B.arch programme by credit transfer with Canadian universities.
 Manipal University, Dubai offers CoA accredited programme.

United Kingdom

Architectural education differs slightly in the United Kingdom. A five-year course used to exist in a similar fashion to the United States, but the 1960s saw the introduction of the sandwich course and a split of the BArch into a 3-year BA (Hons.) degree (or in some cases BSc) followed by a year working in practice, after which a 2-year MA, PG-DipArch, M.Arch. or BArch is completed. A further year of work completes the student's education upon the passing of Part III final examinations (See below). Registration as an architect is then permissible by the Architects Registration Board. Many UK universities offer postgraduate programs by coursework and research in architecture and related fields such as landscape architecture, planning, and urban design.

The RIBA three-part examinations
In effect, for most students to become an architect in the United Kingdom they must pass or be exempted from parts I,II and III of the RIBA's examinations. Completion of the three-year BA or BSc gives an exemption from Part I. Completion of the two-year DipArch, M.Arch. or BArch gives exemption from Part II and the final two years of supervised practical training, with supplemental examinations and assignments, makes up the requirements for Part III.

An alternative route to qualification exists by sitting the exams directly - currently this administered by Oxford Brookes University on behalf of the RIBA.

Studying architecture in the UK 
Universities offering architecture courses validated by the Royal Institute of British Architects in the UK (some offering only some parts of the three parts required):

 Architectural Association, London
 Arts University Bournemouth
 University of Bath
 Birmingham City University
 Coventry University
 University of Brighton
 University of Cambridge
 University of Cardiff
 University for the Creative Arts
 De Montfort University
 University of Dundee
 University of East London
 University of Edinburgh (Edinburgh College of Art)
 University of Glasgow
 Glasgow School of Art (Mackintosh School of Architecture)
 University of Greenwich
 University of Huddersfield
 University of Kent
 Kingston University
 Leeds Metropolitan University
 University of Lincoln
 University of Liverpool
 Liverpool John Moores University
 London Metropolitan University
 London School of Architecture
 London South Bank University
 Manchester School of Architecture at the University of Manchester and Manchester Metropolitan University
 University of Newcastle upon Tyne
 Northumbria University
 University of Nottingham
 Nottingham Trent University
 Oxford Brookes University
 University of Plymouth
 University of Portsmouth
 Queen's University of Belfast
 Robert Gordon University
 Royal College of Art
 University of Sheffield
 Sheffield Hallam University
 University of Strathclyde
 University of Ulster
 University of the Arts, London (Central Saint Martin's College of Art and Design)
 University College London (The Bartlett)
 University of the West of England, Bristol
 University of Westminster

International schools validated by the RIBA 
Several universities outside of the UK offer architecture courses like ADU validated by the Royal Institute of British Architects at part I and part II level. For students who want to study outside of the UK, the RIBA recognized courses offer the advantage of internationally recognized degrees, and other benefits, such as the possibility of RIBA membership.

United States
The Bachelor of Architecture is accredited by the National Architectural Accrediting Board (NAAB) as a professional degree, allowing the recipient to qualify for the Architect Registration Examination (ARE). NAAB-accredited BArch programs must include at least 150 semester credit hours, or the quarter-hour equivalent, of which at least 45 semester hours, or the quarter-hour equivalent are in general studies, typically requiring five years to complete.

There are also universities that offer a four-year degree such as a Bachelor of Science in Architectural Studies or a Bachelor of Science in Architecture (B.S.Arch) or a Bachelor of Arts in Architectural Studies (B.A.Arch). These are non-accredited, pre-professional degrees, and so these students must enroll in a Master of Architecture (M.Arch) program to be professionally licensed. However, enrolling in a pre-professional program may get a student into a shorter M.Arch program.  Any architecturally-related curriculum may eventually make licensure possible, depending upon the laws or regulations of the jurisdiction in which the license is required.

The course of study of the Bachelor of Architecture includes studio courses on design and aesthetic theory, as well as practical courses on structures, building mechanical systems, electrical systems, plumbing and construction. Student work is often in the form of drawings and renderings, either through computer-aided design or drafting by hand. Students also build physical models and create presentation boards for drawings and graphics.

In nearly all architecture schools in the United States, student life and work revolves around a studio class. Other classes in the architecture curriculum are designed to support the concepts emphasized in studio. One particularly rigorous aspect of studio classes is the "critique" or "review." Students "pin-up" their models and presentation drawings for instructors (and students) who offer constructive criticism.

Colleges and universities in the United States where either an NAAB accredited Bachelor of Architecture or Master of Architecture degree can be obtained are listed below. Many schools offer an M.Arch as the first professional degree, preceded by a nonprofessional B.A./B.S. in Architecture undergraduate degree.

 Academy of Art University (B. Arch., M. Arch.)
 Andrews University (M. Arch.)
 Alfred State College (B. Arch.)
 Arizona State University (M. Arch.)
 Auburn University (B. Arch.)
 Ball State University (M. Arch.)
 Boston Architectural College (B. Arch., M. Arch.)
 California College of the Arts (B. Arch., M. Arch.)
 California Polytechnic State University, San Luis Obispo (B. Arch.)
 California State Polytechnic University, Pomona (program) (B. Arch., M. Arch.)
 Carnegie Mellon University (B. Arch.)
 Catholic University of America (M. Arch.)
 City College of the City University of New York (B. Arch., M. Arch.)
 Clemson University (M. Arch.)
 Columbia University (M. Arch.)
 Cooper Union (B. Arch., M.Arch)
 Cornell University (B. Arch., M. Arch.)
 Drexel University (B. Arch.)
 Drury University (M. Arch.)
 Dunwoody College of Technology (B. Arch.)
 Florida A&M University (B. Arch., M. Arch.)
 Florida Atlantic University (B. Arch.)
 Georgia Institute of Technology (M. Arch)
 Hampton University (M. Arch.)
 Harvard University (M. Arch.)
 Howard University (M. Arch.)
 Illinois Institute of Technology (B. Arch., M. Arch.)
 Iowa State University (B. Arch., M. Arch.)
 Judson University (M. Arch.)
 Kennesaw State University (B. Arch.)
 Kansas State University (M. Arch.)
 Kent State University (M. Arch.)
 Lawrence Technological University (M. Arch.)
 Louisiana State University (B. Arch., M. Arch.)
 Louisiana Tech University (M. Arch.)
 Massachusetts Institute of Technology (M. Arch.)
 Miami University (M. Arch.)
 Mississippi State University (B. Arch.)
 Montana State University (M. Arch.)
 Morgan State University (M. Arch.)
 New Jersey Institute of Technology (B. Arch., M. Arch.)
 NewSchool of Architecture and Design (B. Arch., M. Arch.)
 New York Institute of Technology (B. Arch., M.Arch)
 New York City College of Technology (B. Arch.)
 North Carolina State University (B. Arch., M. Arch.)
 North Dakota State University (M. Arch.)
 Northeastern University (M. Arch.)
 Norwich University (M. Arch.)
 Ohio State University (M. Arch.)
 Oklahoma State University (B. Arch.)
 Parsons School of Design (M. Arch.)
 Pennsylvania State University (B. Arch.)
 Pennsylvania College of Technology (B. Arch.)
 Philadelphia University (B. Arch.)
 Polytechnic University of Puerto Rico (B. Arch.)
 Portland State University (M. Arch.)
 Prairie View A&M University (M. Arch.)
 Pratt Institute (B. Arch., M. Arch.)
 Princeton University (M. Arch.)
 Rensselaer Polytechnic Institute (B. Arch., M. Arch.)
 Rhode Island School of Design (B. Arch., M. Arch.)
 Rice University (B. Arch., M. Arch.)
 Roger Williams University (M. Arch.)
 Savannah College of Art and Design (M. Arch.)
 School of Architecture at Taliesin (M.Arch.)
 Southern California Institute of Architecture (B. Arch., M. Arch.)
 Southern Illinois University Carbondale (M. Arch.)
 Southern Polytechnic State University (B. Arch.)
 Southern University and A&M College (B. Arch.)
 Syracuse University (B. Arch., M. Arch.)
 The School of the Art Institute of Chicago (M. Arch.)
 Temple University (M. Arch.)
 Texas A&M University (M. Arch.)
 Texas Tech University (M. Arch.)
 Tulane University (B. Arch., M. Arch.)
 Tuskegee University (B. Arch.)
 University of Arizona (B. Arch.)
 University at Buffalo (M. Arch.)
 University of Arkansas (B. Arch.)
 University of California, Berkeley (program) (M. Arch.)
 University of California, Los Angeles (M. Arch.)
 University of Cincinnati (M. Arch.)
 University of Colorado (M. Arch.)
 University of Detroit Mercy (M. Arch.)
 University of Florida (M. Arch.)
 University of Hartford (M. Arch.)
 University of Hawaii at Manoa (D. Arch.)
 University of Houston, Gerald D. Hines College of Architecture (B. Arch., M. Arch.)
 University of Idaho (M. Arch.)
 University of Illinois at Chicago (M. Arch.)
 University of Illinois at Urbana–Champaign (M. Arch.)
 University of Kansas (M. Arch.)
 University of Kentucky (M. Arch.)
 University of Louisiana at Lafayette (M. Arch.)
 University of Maryland (M. Arch.)
 University of Massachusetts Amherst (M. Arch.)
 University of Memphis (M. Arch.)
 University of Miami (B. Arch., M. Arch.)
 University of Michigan (M. Arch.)
 University of Minnesota (M. Arch.)
 University of Nebraska–Lincoln (M. Arch.)
 University of Nevada, Las Vegas (M. Arch.)
 University of New Mexico (M. Arch.)
 University of North Carolina at Charlotte (B. Arch., M. Arch.)
 University of Notre Dame (B. Arch., M. Arch.)
 University of Oklahoma (B. Arch., M. Arch.)
 University of Oregon (B. Arch., M. Arch.)
 University of Pennsylvania (M. Arch.)
 Universidad de Puerto Rico (M. Arch.)
 University of South Florida (M. Arch.)
 University of Southern California (B. Arch., M. Arch.)
 University of Tennessee (B. Arch., M. Arch.)
 University of Texas at Arlington (M. Arch.)
 University of Texas at Austin (B. Arch., M. Arch.)
 University of Texas at San Antonio (M. Arch.)
 University of Utah (M. Arch.)
 University of Virginia (M. Arch.)
 University of Washington (M. Arch.)
 University of Wisconsin–Milwaukee (M. Arch.)
 Virginia Polytechnic Institute and State University (B. Arch., M. Arch.)
 Washington State University (M. Arch.)
 Washington University in St. Louis (M. Arch.)
 Wentworth Institute of Technology (M. Arch.)
 Woodbury University (B. Arch., M. Arch.)
 Yale University (M. Arch.)

See also
"The World's Best Architecture Schools"
Master of Architecture
List of international architecture schools
Vocational university

References 

Architecture, Bachelor of
Architectural education